Michael Halliday (1925–2018) was a British-born Australian linguist .

Michael Halliday may also refer to:

 Michael Frederick Halliday (1822–1869), English amateur artist
 Michael Halliday (cricketer) (born 1948), Irish former cricketer
 Michael Halliday (footballer) (born 1979), footballer from Northern Ireland
 Michael Halliday (soccer) (born 2003), American soccer player
 Pseudonym of John Creasey (1908–1973), English crime and science fiction writer